The Fitzwilliam Quartet (FSQ) is a British string quartet.
The group was founded in 1968 by four Cambridge undergraduates. There have been a number of changes in personnel over the years, but Alan George from the original quartet is still a member as of 2019. It currently consists of Alan George, viola; Sally Pendlebury, violoncello; and Lucy Russell and Marcus Barcham Stevens, violins.

The Fitzwilliam Quartet was one of the first of a long line of quartets to have emerged under the guidance of Sidney Griller at the Royal Academy of Music. They became well known through their close personal association with Dmitri Shostakovich, who befriended them following a visit to York to hear them play. He entrusted them with the Western premières of his last three quartets, and before long they had become the first group to perform and record all fifteen. These recordings gained international awards, and secured for the quartet a worldwide concert schedule and a long term contract with Decca/London.

In 1977, they won the first ever Gramophone Award for chamber music. In November 2005 the Shostakovich set was included in Gramophone magazine's "100 Greatest Recordings". Today, the FSQ performs a wide repertoire, from the late 17th century to the present day, and remains one of the few established quartets to play on historical instrument setups.

In May 2000, a collaboration with Linn Records began with Haydn's The Seven Last Words of Christ. Recordings continued with the Brahms Clarinet Quintet together with clarinetist Lesley Schatzberger. They have made a disc of 20th-century English songs with piano quintet (including Vaughan Williams's On Wenlock Edge), featuring collaborations with James Gilchrist and Anna Tilbrook. 2012 saw the release of two contemporary recordings, by geologist and composer John Ramsay on Divine Art Records and by South African composer and pianist Michael Blake.

In addition to his Fitzwilliam duties, Alan George is the Musical Director of the Academy of St Olave's chamber orchestra.

Residencies
They have been resident quartet at several universities, including the University of Warwick in 1974-77.
In 1998, they re-established their connection with Fitzwilliam College, Cambridge, their namesake and their original rehearsal venue, when they were appointed Resident Quartet; they perform and lead workshops at the college. In 2010 they began a residency at the University of St Andrews in Scotland, where they hold an annual string chamber music workshop, Strings in Spring. They are in residence at Bucknell University in Lewisburg, Pennsylvania.

References

External links
 Fitzwilliam Quartet

English string quartets
Fitzwilliam College, Cambridge
Grammy Award winners
Musical groups from Cambridge
Musical groups established in 1968